Jade Warrior (Finnish: Jadesoturi, Estonian: Igavese armastuse sõdalane) is a Finnish-Chinese co-produced movie. It combines elements of the wuxia genre with Finnish Kalevala mythology. It was directed by Antti-Jussi Annila.

The movie opened in Finland on 13 October 2006 with 40 copies. The film debuted at #2, right after The Devil Wears Prada. It opened in China on 24 October with 150 copies in 70 cities. Jade Warrior is the first Finnish movie to be released in movie theaters in China. In addition to China, the movie's international distribution rights have been sold to more than 30 countries. In Finland, the movie grossed €607,038 with 79,050 tickets sold.

In 2007, Jade Warrior received the Jussi Award for Best Costume Design (Anna Vilppunen) and Best Film Score (Kimmo Pohjonen and Samuli Kosminen).

Plot
Inspired by the Finnish epic The Kalevala, the story opens with a down-on-his luck novice blacksmith named Kai whose girlfriend, Ronja, leaves him. Ronja tries to dispose of his collection of Asian artifacts and what appears to be an urn full of ashes at an antique dealer. The ashes are his burned up hair and nail clippings, used by blacksmiths to prevent rust. This sets off a mythical series of events that holds Ronja back from leaving town. The ashes open a mythical chest, which causes Kai to remember a past life where he was a half-Chinese half-Finnish warrior named Sintai, fated to battle a demon in ancient China, threatening to enslave all of humankind.

Sintai is fated to be rewarded with Nirvana upon dying in that lifetime if he killed the demon. Sintai is abetted—and then ultimately disheartened—by a female warrior named Pin Yu, who has captured his heart. Shortly after, Pin Yu unexpectedly finds her lost lover, Cho, who is Sintai's friend. Upon realizing this, Sintai uses a magical chest to imprison the demon and escape Nirvana. He then commits suicide to be reborn as Kai, who is being instructed by the now freed demon to build the Sampo, an item that will open the gates to hell. Kai's remembering and the sampo building are transposed to each other. Finally, Kai realizes what he has done and knows his complete past life and, with Pin Yu now reincarnated as Ronja and potentially returned to his side, he decides to fulfill his original quest and kill the demon.

Cast
Tommi Eronen – Kai/Sintai, a blacksmith and son of a blacksmith
Markku Peltola – Berg, Weckström's partner
Krista Kosonen – Ronja, ex-girlfriend of Kai
Zhang Jingchu – Pin Yu
Elle Kull – Weckström, an archaeologist
Taiseng Cheng – Demon (as Cheng Taishen)
Hao Dang – Cho

Reception
The reception of the Jade Warrior was critical in China. Criticism of local newspapers criticized the film as difficult to understand: it moves both in Finland and China and even between different eras. In addition, the Chinese pronunciation of Finnish actors was not considered good, but rather ridiculous.

Reviews
CineFantastico.com link  
Cinematic Happenings Under Development  link 
Twitch Films link

Soundtrack

According to the MTV3 website, the soundtrack was released on 11 October 2006.

References

External links

 
 Jade Warrior at NordicFantasy

2006 films
Kung fu films
Wuxia films
Martial arts fantasy films
2000s Finnish-language films
2000s Mandarin-language films
Demons in film
Films based on Finno-Ugric mythology
Films about reincarnation
Finnish multilingual films
Chinese multilingual films
2006 multilingual films
Works based on the Kalevala